Calvin Throckmorton (born August 16, 1996) is an American football offensive tackle for the New Orleans Saints of the National Football League (NFL). He played college football at Oregon.

Early life and high school
Throckmorton grew up in Bellevue, Washington and attended Newport High School, where he played both offensive and defensive line for the football team. He was rated a three-star prospect by Rivals, 247Sports, Scout, and ESPN and committed to play college football at Oregon over offers from Arizona, Arizona State, Boise State, Michigan, and Miami.

College career

Throckmorton redshirted his true freshman season. He started all 12 of Oregon's games the following year and was named honorable mention All-Pac-12 Conference. He started the first ten games of his redshirt sophomore season at right tackle before moving to right guard for the final three games of the year and was again named honorable mention All-Pac-12. As a redshirt junior, Throckmorton was the only FBS player to make a start at four different offensive line positions (right tackle, left tackle, right guard and center) and also played snaps at left guard. He was graded the fourth-best offensive tackle in college football by Pro Football Focus (PFF) and was named a second-team All-American by the FWAA, Phil Steele, and PFF as well as first-team All-Pac-12 by the Associated Press and honorable mention All-conference by the league's coaches.

Throckmorton entered his redshirt senior season on the watchlist for the Outland Trophy and was named a preseason All-American by the Associated Press and PFF. He was also named the fifth-best offensive line prospect for the 2020 NFL Draft by USA Today. Throckmorton was named honorable mention All-Pac-12 and a third-team All-American by the Associated Press, as well as a second-team Academic All-American, at the end of the season.

Professional career

Throckmorton signed with the New Orleans Saints as an undrafted free agent on April 27, 2020, shortly after the conclusion of the 2020 NFL Draft. He was waived on September 5, 2020, and signed to the practice squad the next day. On January 18, 2021, Throckmorton signed a reserve/futures contract with the Saints. Throckmorton made the Saints' 53-man roster out of training camp at the start of the 2021 season. He made his NFL debut in the Saints' season opener against the Green Bay Packers on September 12, 2021. In the game, Throckmorton replaced Cesar Ruiz at right guard while Ruiz took over at center due to Erik McCoy leaving in the first quarter due to a calf injury. He continued being the team's starting right guard for the next four games until Week 7. In Week 8, Throckmorton became the stating left guard after Andrus Peat was placed on injured reserve.

References

External links 
 New Orleans Saints bio
 Oregon Ducks bio

1996 births
Living people
Players of American football from Washington (state)
Sportspeople from Bellevue, Washington
American football offensive tackles
Oregon Ducks football players
New Orleans Saints players